The Furious Flower Poetry Center is the first academic center in the United States devoted to African American poetry, housed by James Madison University. Dr. Joanne V. Gabbin is the current executive director. English professor Lauren Allenye serves as an assistant director. 

Even beyond its decennial conferences, the FFPC is very active, both on and off campus. The many activities it hosts includes poetry camps during the summer for the youth, workshops, and visits for poets. Aside from its substantial collection of Black poetry, the Center also has an online journal titled The Fight & the Fiddle.

History 
The Furious Flower Poetry Center (FFPC) was established by Joanne V. Gabbin in 1999 at James Madison University. The name of the center comes from Gwendolyn Brooks' poem, "Second Sermon on the Warpland." In the poem she writes,

The time

cracks into furious flower. Lifts its face

all unashamed. And sways in wicked grace.

Gabbin was the director of the James Madison University's Honors Program. She hosted the first Furious Flower Poetry Conference in 1994. It was the United States' first scholarly conference on Black poetry. After the success of the second Furious Flower Conference in 2004, James Madison granted FFPC its charter. Through this charter, FFPC became the first academic center in the United States devoted to Black Poetry. Today the center is  committed to “cultivating, honoring, and promoting the diverse voices of African American poets by making the genre accessible to a wide audience and collaborating with educational and cultural institutions, literary organizations, and artists.”

Conferences 
Since its establishment, the FFPC has held three decennial conferences: "A Revolution in African American Poetry" (1994), "Regenerating the Black Poetic Tradition" (2004), and "Seeding the Future of African American Poetry" (2014). Each conference features African American poets and scholars readings, which are free and open to the public.

A Revolution in African American Poetry 
The first conference included more than 30 poets. Among these were Nikki Giovanni, Gwendolyn Brooks, Amiri Baraka, and Sonya Sanchez.  This event sparked the beginning of a contemporary Black renaissance.

Furious Flower: Regenerating the Black Poetic Tradition 
The second conference by the FFPC was held on September 22–25, 2004. This conference was held ten years after the first. Dr. Joanne Gabbin dedicated the conference to Amiri Baraka and Sonia Sanchez, architects of the Black Arts Movement. More than 50 poets and scholars shared their work and spoke on Black poetry. After this conference, James Madison established the Furious Flower Poetry Center and Gabbin became the executive director.

Seeding the Future of African American Poetry
The third conference held by FFPC was September 24–27, 2014 at James Madison. The FFPC dedicated the conference to Rita Dove. The conference also recognized literary trailblazers Toi Derricotte, Michael Harper, Yusef Komunyakaa, Marilyn Nelson, Ishmael Reed, and Quincy Troupe with Lifetime Achievement Awards.

Over 300 scholars traveled to JMU’s campus to attend the FFPC’s third conference, consisting of concerts, readings, gallery receptions, panels, and group discussions. The University was also very involved in the event, contributing more than ⅓ of the budget. In addition to financial resources, many students, teachers and faculty members devoted their time to the event.

Partnerships 
Bringing the celebration of Black poetry along with it, the FFPC celebrated its 25th anniversary at the opening of The Smithsonian’s National Museum of African American History and Culture’s fall programming. Black poets such as Nikki Giovanni, Yusef Komunyakaa, Sonia Sanchez, Gregory Pardlo, Terrance Hayes, Tyehimba Jess, and the Swazi Poets of South Africa performed some of their pieces. In addition to this, the FFPC hosted workshops and discussions to further recognize Black literature. There were also opportunities to purchase the works of these writers at the event. 

The FFPC held a tribute to the late poet Lucille Clifton, a prestigious Black female writer and a recipient of the 2000 National Book Award for Poetry. The event was also another partnership with an outside organization, Virginia Tech Steger Poetry Prize. Director Joanne Gabbin personally worked with Nikki Giovanni to plan this tribute. Beautifully coordinated, 73 poems were read to commemorate each year of the Clifton’s life. In addition, the Center called on other Black women poets to read her work, showcasing the tradition of Black women intellect. 

Target Stores, Inc. partnered with the FFPC, Maya Angelou and the Poetry Foundation to create an online curriculum where students could have public access to a collection of Black literature. They also hosted several King Day Events throughout the United States with a goal of raising the recognition of Black achievements and societal contributions. One of these events was hosted at Morehouse College in Atlanta, GA, King’s alma mater. 

The FFPC is included in a partnership with the University of Kansas to create another academic center that will spur the recognition of Black literary intellect. A grant of $189,000 from the National Endowment for the Humanities was given to the University of Kansas to fund an institute that would focus on the teaching and appreciation of African-American poetry.  The FFPC partners with KU by sharing its collection of Black literature with the institute. The two collaborated again to create a federally funded three-week program within the institute, “Don't Deny My Voice: Reading and Teaching African American Poetry." Twenty-five teachers were selected to attend.

Publications
 Shaping Memories: Reflections of African American Women Writers, University Press of Mississippi August 11, 2009
 Mourning Katrina: A Poetic Response to Tragedy, Mariner Media January 5, 2009
 Furious Flower: African American Poetry from the Black Arts Movement to the Present, University of Virginia Press February 13, 2004
 The Furious Flower of African American Poetry, University of Virginia Press July 29, 1999
 The Painted Word: African American Poets Notecards, Pomegranate 2004
 Rita Dove's "Ode to My Right Knee" Broadside, Virginia Arts of the Book with Furious Flower Poetry Center 2014

References

External links
Official site
Official Archive

African-American poetry
James Madison University
Organizations established in 1999
1999 establishments in Virginia